Russell Cecchini is a paralympic athlete from Canada competing mainly in category C1 events.

Russell competed in the 1984 Summer Paralympics, in athletics, boccia and swimming. In Boccia, he won a silver medal in the Men's Individual C1 event. In Swimming, he won a bronze medal in the Men's 25 m Freestyle with Aids C1.

References

External links 
 

Year of birth missing (living people)
Living people
Paralympic boccia players of Canada
Paralympic swimmers of Canada
Paralympic medalists in swimming
Paralympic silver medalists for Canada
Paralympic bronze medalists for Canada
Paralympic medalists in boccia
Athletes (track and field) at the 1984 Summer Paralympics
Boccia players at the 1984 Summer Paralympics
Swimmers at the 1984 Summer Paralympics
Medalists at the 1984 Summer Paralympics
Paralympic track and field athletes of Canada
Canadian male freestyle swimmers